The 2022–2023 mpox outbreak in Europe is a part of the outbreak of human mpox caused by the West African clade of the monkeypox virus. The outbreak reached Europe on 6 May 2022 when the United Kingdom reported their first case of mpox.  35 European countries and territories have confirmed cases.

Background

Transmission 

A large portion of those infected were believed to have not recently traveled to areas of Africa where mpox is normally found, such as Nigeria, the Democratic Republic of the Congo as well as central and western Africa. It is believed to be transmitted by close contact with sick people, with extra caution for those individuals with lesions on their skin or genitals, along with their bedding and clothing. The CDC has also stated that individuals should avoid contact and consumption of dead animals such as rats, squirrels, monkeys and apes along with wild game or lotions derived from animals in Africa.

In addition to more common symptoms, such as fever, headache, swollen lymph nodes, and rashes or lesions, some patients have also experienced proctitis, an inflammation of the rectum lining. CDC has also warned clinicians to not rule out mpox in patients with sexually transmitted infections since there have been reports of co-infections with syphilis, gonorrhea, chlamydia, and herpes.

Timeline

Arrival 

An index case was imported into the United Kingdom in late April 2022, by a man who had travelled to Nigeria, where the disease is endemic. He had already showed symptoms since 29 April, and was admitted to hospital in London on 6 May. On 12 May, the man was confirmed to have contracted mpox. The following day, another mpox case was confirmed, and the United Kingdom reported these cases to the World Health Organization (WHO).

Cases transited through Europe

May

18 May 

On 18 May, Spain and Portugal both confirmed their first cases of mpox following the confirmation of mpox in the United Kingdom starting an outbreak in the countries. It is unknown how it was contracted, but most likely via travel or skin-to-skin contact abroad.

19 May 
On 19 May, Belgium confirmed its first cases of mpox in two Belgian men, it was later confirmed by Reuters that the men had gone to the same party.

Later, Italy confirmed its first case of mpox in an Italian man in Rome, the man was isolated at the Spallanzani Hospital. The disease was likely contracted from a stay in the Canary Islands. There were 2 suspected cases, which later became confirmed cases.

Sweden then confirmed its first case of mpox in Stockholm, the Swedish Health Agency confirmed it later. The person was not reported to be a woman or a man, but it was most likely a man. It is unknown how it was contracted, but likely via travel or skin-to-skin contact abroad.

20 May 

On 20 May, France reported their first case of mpox. The patient had no travel history, meaning he didn't contract the disease abroad.

On the same day, Germany and the Netherlands reported their first cases of mpox. It was unknown how it was contracted in both stories, but likely via travel or skin-to-skin contact abroad.

21 May 
On 21 May, Switzerland confirmed its first case of mpox. It was in a person of undisclosed gender, contracted through "close physical contact" abroad, according to Reuters.

22 May 
On 22 May, Austria confirmed its first case of mpox. It is unknown how it was contracted or who contracted it, but likely via travel or skin-to-skin contact abroad.

23 May 
On 23 May, Denmark detected its first mpox infection. It was in an adult male, likely contracted from a trip to Spain, according to Reuters. No cases of mpox were detected in Greenland, a Danish constituent country in North America.

24 May 
On 24 May, the Czech Republic registered its first case of mpox in a woman, likely picked up from a festival in Belgium, according to Reuters.

On the same day, Slovenia also registered its first case of mpox. It was in a traveller of undisclosed gender who likely contracted mpox from a trip to the Canary Islands, according to Reuters.

27 May 
On 27 May, Ireland confirmed its first case of mpox in the east of the country. The Health Protection Surveillance Centre (HPSC) commenced publication of a weekly report on the epidemiology of human mpox in Ireland on 9 June.

On the same day, Finland also confirmed its first case of mpox. It was in a man who likely had contracted the disease from a trip to another European country, according to Reuters.

28 May 
On 28 May, Malta registered its first case of mpox. It was in an adult male, who most likely picked up the disease abroad from one of the countries affected by the outbreak, according to the Malta Times.

31 May 
On 31 May, Hungary confirmed its first case of mpox, in an adult male. It is still being investigated whether or not he recently travelled, though it is unknown how the man contracted the disease.

On the same day, Norway confirmed its first case of mpox. It was in a person of undisclosed gender who most likely contracted the disease from travelling abroad. The case was linked to the ongoing outbreak in Europe, meaning that the patient may have travelled to a European country that was affected by the outbreak.

June

1 June 
On 1 June, Gibraltar, a British Overseas Territory, registered its first case of mpox in a Spanish resident of undisclosed gender working in Gibraltar. The patient likely contracted the disease from close contact with another Spanish national also working in Gibraltar.

3 June 
On 3 June, Latvia confirmed its first mpox infection. It was in an elderly person of undisclosed gender who most likely contracted the disease abroad.

8 June 
On 8 June, Greece confirmed the country's first mpox case. It was in a person of undisclosed gender who likely contracted the disease from a trip to Portugal.

9 June 
On 9 June, Iceland confirmed its first mpox case. It was in two men who most likely contracted the disease from a trip to Europe.

10 June 
On 10 June, Poland confirmed its first mpox case. It is unknown who the patient is or how it was contracted, but it is possible it was picked up via travel or skin-to-skin contact.

13 June 
On 13 June, Romania confirmed its first monkempoxypox infection. It was in an adult male who most likely contracted the disease from his partner who travelled in several different European countries that have been affected by mpox at the time.

15 June 
On 15 June, Luxembourg confirmed its first mpox case. It is unknown how it was contracted, though it is being investigated. The disease was likely picked up via travelling abroad or skin-to-skin contact.

On the same day, Georgia also confirmed its first case of mpox. It was in a patient of undisclosed gender who likely contracted the disease from a trip to Europe.

17 June 
On 17 June, Serbia confirmed its first case of mpox. It was in a patient of undisclosed gender. It was revealed that it was an "imported case", meaning that the patient may have contracted the disease abroad.

23 June 
On 23 June, Bulgaria confirmed its first mpox case. It was in two men who most likely contracted the disease from a trip to Spain and the United Kingdom but don't reckon any contact with infected persons.

On the same day, Croatia also received its first case of mpox. It was in an adult man who most likely contracted the disease from a stay in Italy and Spain.

28 June 
On 28 June, Estonia confirmed its first case of mpox. It was in a middle-aged man who most likely contracted the disease abroad. He had no close contacts with anyone in Estonia.

July

2 July 
On 2 July, Andorra registered its first mpox case in a woman of unknown age. It is unknown how it was contracted, but it may likely have been picked up either abroad via travel or via skin-to-skin contact.

7 July 
On July 7, Slovakia received its first case of mpox. It was in a person of undisclosed gender in the 20-59 age group who most likely contracted the disease abroad.

12 July 
On 12 July, Russia confirmed its first case of mpox. It was in a man probably in his 20-25 age group who likely contracted the disease from a trip to Europe where the outbreak had started. The man then tested positive for the virus and was isolated in a hospital, most likely in Saint Petersburg.

13 July 
On 13 July, Bosnia and Herzegovina registered its first mpox case. It is unknown how it was contracted, although the disease was likely picked up abroad via travel or skin-to-skin contact.

22 July

September

15 September 
On 15 September, Ukraine's Ministry of Health reported the country's first case of mpox. The Ministry noted that the patient, who did not travel abroad, was experiencing "mild symptoms" and undergoing hospital treatment. The region where the case was reported was not disclosed.

Responses

World Health Organization (WHO)
On 20 May, the WHO convened an emergency meeting of independent advisers to discuss the outbreak and assess the threat level. Its European chief, Hans Kluge, expressed concern that infections could accelerate in Europe as people gather for parties and festivals over the summer. On 14 June, the WHO announced plans to rename the disease from monkeypox to mpox in order to combat stigma and racism surrounding the disease. Another meeting convened on 23 June determined that the outbreak does not constitute a Public Health Emergency of International Concern for the time being.

Countries
The majority of European countries responded to the outbreak, and the responses of some are listed below.
: The Risk Assessment Group (RAG) and health authorities declared that those infected with mpox must self-isolate for 21 days.
: Fabian Leendertz of the Robert Koch Institute described the outbreak as an epidemic that will not last long: "The cases can be well isolated via contact tracing and there are also drugs and effective vaccines that can be used if necessary."
: The Health Service Executive (HSE) has set up a multidisciplinary incident management team to prepare for the possible arrival of mpox, and infectious diseases experts are on alert for patients with symptoms of the virus.
: On 23 May, the Ministry of Health and the National Public Health Institute, have drafted a document of recommendations and measures to help prevent the spread of the disease. In a press statement, healthcare authorities have declared that the situation is being closely monitored.
: On 21 May, the Ministry of Health said that they are monitoring the situation with its Europe. he National Infectious Diseases Department of the HLC and refrain from close contact activities until the infection has resolved.
: On 22 May, Education Secretary Nadhim Zahawi said "we're taking it very, very seriously" and that the UK government had already started purchasing smallpox vaccines. The Terrence Higgins Trust and British Association for Sexual Health and HIV (BASHH) expressed concern about the impact on sexual health services in the United Kingdom.

Dependent territories
: On 31 May, a Strategic Coordination Group met to discuss Gibraltar's state of preparedness in the eventuality that a case of mpox was confirmed in the territory amid the rapid rise of cases in the United Kingdom and Spain.

Cases per country and territory
This is a table of confirmed and suspected mpox cases in European countries during the ongoing 2022–2023 mpox outbreak. It does not include countries where suspected cases were reported but later discarded.

Timeline of first confirmed cases by country or territory

Timeline of suspected cases by country or territory 
Countries listed below had only suspected cases at the time of reporting. Some countries reported confirmed cases after reporting suspected cases. Countries listed several times reported suspected cases again after they discarded suspected cases before.

 33 European countries and territories have been affected by the pandemic.

See also 

 Mpox
 Monkeypox virus
 Mpox in Nigeria
 Mpox in the Democratic Republic of the Congo
 2022–2023 mpox outbreak
 Timeline of the 2022–2023 mpox outbreak
 2022–2023 mpox outbreak in Asia
 2022–2023 mpox outbreak in Canada
 2022–2023 mpox outbreak in Germany
 2022–2023 mpox outbreak in the Netherlands
 2022–2023 mpox outbreak in Portugal
 2022–2023 mpox outbreak in Spain
 2022–2023 mpox outbreak in the United Kingdom
 2022–2023 mpox outbreak in the United States

Notes

References

External links

Europe
Monkeypox